The White River (Ottawa: Wabigungweshcupago, "White Clay River") is a  river located on the western side of the Lower Peninsula of the U.S. state of Michigan. Its source is the Oxford Swamp in Newaygo County. The rural town of Hesperia borders the river.

Continuing onward, the White River flows in a southwesterly direction through the southern section of Manistee National Forest. The river passes through Oceana County and into Muskegon County and White Lake. The lake and river discharge into Lake Michigan, near the towns of Whitehall and Montague.

The river has a large population of wild brook trout, which have not been fished for much of its length. It is very common to only find fish eight inches or longer. The population is healthy and regularly produces large,  even trophy trout. The trout prefer to feed on creek chubs and flies, and take to lure imitations very well.

The White River is designated as a State of Michigan Natural River, which includes a special zoning overlay preventing land development from occurring within 400 feet of the riverbank.

Bridges

See also
List of rivers of Michigan

References

Rivers of Muskegon County, Michigan
Rivers of Newaygo County, Michigan
Rivers of Oceana County, Michigan
Rivers of Michigan
Tributaries of Lake Michigan